Tiébissou Department is a department of Bélier Region in Lacs District, Ivory Coast. In 2021, its population was 116,321 and its seat is the settlement of Tiébissou. The sub-prefectures of the department are Lomokankro, Molonou, Tiébissou, and Yakpabo-Sakassou.

History

Tiébissou Department was created in 1998 as a second-level subdivision via a split-off from Yamoussoukro Department. At its creation, it was part of Lacs Region.

In 2005, Tiébissou Department was divided in order to create Didiévi Department.

In 2011, districts were introduced as new first-level subdivisions of Ivory Coast. At the same time, regions were reorganised and became second-level subdivisions and all departments were converted into third-level subdivisions. At this time, Tiébissou Department became part of Bélier Region in Lacs District.

Notes

Departments of Bélier
1998 establishments in Ivory Coast
States and territories established in 1998